The New Zealand National American Football Team, nicknamed the Steelblacks, represent New Zealand in international American football (gridiron) competitions. Steelblacks is the new nickname for the team following the transition of governance of the sport to New Zealand American Football Federation, replacing Ironblacks.

The Ironblacks were formerly known as the Haka, until 2003 when the branding changed to the present Ironblacks image in preparation for Oceania Bowl II against the Australian Outbacks.

The Steelblacks nickname is one of many national team nicknames related to the All Blacks.

See also
New Zealand American Football Federation
American football

External links
Ironblacks official site

American football in New Zealand
American Football
Men's national American football teams